Eburodacrystola pickeli is a species of beetle in the family Cerambycidae, the only species in the genus Eburodacrystola.

References

Eburiini